Donny Hay (born 1959) is a former Scottish field hockey player who played for the Scotland men's national field hockey team gaining 51 caps as a striker during the 1980s.  Hay also played for the Scotland indoor hockey team.  He played club hockey for Plexus Mercian and Grange.

Hay played in Scotland's first ever outdoor victory against Spain in 1983. Scotland won the match 1-0 in Barcelona.

Hay was part of the Grange squad that played in the 1995 European Cup Winners' Cup tournament in Sardinia.  Grange losing to Real Club de Polo de Barcelona (ESP) 3-1, Harvestehuder THC (GER) 3-0, SKA Ekaterinburg (RUS) 3-1 and beating MZKS Poczotwiec (POL) 3-1 to finish sixth overall.

In 2003 he was in the Scotland squad that played in the Home Countries Veterans' Tournament held in Edinburgh.

References

1959 births
Living people
People educated at Strathallan School
Alumni of Heriot-Watt University
Scottish male field hockey players
Plexus Mercian